The Atlanta Fire Rescue Department provides fire protection and first responder emergency medical services to the city of Atlanta, Georgia. As of January 21, 2021, the Fire Chief is Rod Smith.

History
The Atlanta Fire Rescue Department got its start in February 1848 when residents were ordered to have fire buckets ready in their homes. It wasn't until three years later, after several major fires, that the Georgia Legislature approved a bill that authorized the formation of Atlanta Fire Company No. 1, which went into service on March 25, 1851.

Stations and apparatus

The Atlanta Fire Rescue Department currently operates out of 34 fire stations, located throughout the city of Atlanta, organized into 7 Battalions, including an Airport Battalion commanding 5 Fire Stations that serve the Hartsfield-Jackson Airport. Below is a list of all of the fire station locations in the city.

Former stations 

 Fire Station No. 6, a contributing property of the NRHP-listed Martin Luther King Jr. National Historical Park
 Fire Station No. 11, NRHP-listed

Notable incidents

Great Atlanta fire

The Great Atlanta fire of 1917 broke out in the Old Fourth Ward around 12:30 pm on May 21, 1917. At the time of the fire, the department had simple horse-drawn fire apparatus and the city's fire hydrants were running with low pressure. It is unclear just how the fire started, but it was fueled by hot temperatures and strong winds. After nearly 10 hours,  had burned, destroying 1,900 structures and displacing over 10,000 people. Damages were estimated at $5 million, ($ million when adjusted for inflation).

Winecoff Hotel fire

The Winecoff Hotel fire, which occurred on December 7, 1946, was the deadliest hotel fire in United States history, killing 119 hotel occupants, including the hotel's owners. The Winecoff Hotel had been advertised as "absolutely fireproof." While the hotel's steel structure was indeed protected against the effects of fire, the hotel's interior finishes were combustible, and the building's exit arrangements consisted of a single stairway serving all fifteen floors. All of the hotel's occupants above the fire's origin on the third floor were trapped, and the fire's survivors either were rescued from upper-story windows or jumped into nets held by firemen.

Fire Station No. 16

During the civil rights movement, members of the African-American community pressured the Mayor and City Council of Atlanta to integrate the city's fire department. In 1962, Mayor Ivan Allen Jr. authorized the first hiring of sixteen African American firemen. On April 1, 1963, after completing training, they were housed at Fire Station No. 16, as stations were not yet integrated. Located in 1048 Simpson Rd. (now Joseph E. Boone Blvd.), the station was built upon the former property of Theodore "Tiger" Flowers, the world's first African American middleweight champion. Continuing the efforts to diversify the fire department, Mayor Maynard Jackson ordered the hiring of seven African-American women to serve as firefighters in 1977.

Bluffton University bus accident

The Bluffton University bus accident was an automobile crash that occurred during the early morning hours of March 2, 2007, on Interstate 75 in Atlanta. A chartered motorcoach was carrying 33 members of the Bluffton University baseball team when at about 5:38 am EST, the bus rolled off of an overpass killing seven and injuring 29 others. The Atlanta Fire Rescue Department was the primary agency on scene for the crash.

References

External links
 Steve B. Campbell Atlanta Fire Department Photographs, 1882-1972 from the Atlanta History Center

Organizations based in Atlanta
Fire departments in Georgia (U.S. state)